Veaceslav Gojan (born 18 May 1983) is a Moldovan amateur boxer who won Bantamweight bronze at the 2008 Olympics. He comes from the village of Grimăncăuţi, district of Briceni (north of Moldova) and is a member of the Central Sport Club Dinamo in Chişinău. His coach is Petru Caduc.

Career
Gojan failed to qualify for the 2004 Summer Olympics after ending up in third place at the 4th AIBA European 2004 Olympic Qualifying Tournament in Baku, Azerbaijan.

He qualified for the 2008 Summer Olympics by beating German boxer Rustamhodza Rahimov in the semifinal of a European qualifying tournament. 
In Beijing he made it to the semifinal by defeating Khavazhi Khatsigov (Belarus) 1-1, countback, Gu Yu (China) 13-6 and Akhil Kumar (India) 10-3 then he lost to Mongolian Enkhbatyn Badar-Uugan 2:15. (Boxing at the 2008 Summer Olympics – Bantamweight)

He won the 2011 European Amateur Boxing Championships.
At the 2012 Olympic qualifier he lost his first bout vs Pavlo Ishchenko and didn't make it.

World Series of Boxing record

References

External links
 Olympic qualifier
 AIBA results for Olympic qualification.
 Veaceslav Gojan

Moldovan male boxers
1983 births
Bantamweight boxers
Living people
Boxers at the 2008 Summer Olympics
Olympic boxers of Moldova
Olympic bronze medalists for Moldova
Olympic medalists in boxing
People from Briceni District
Medalists at the 2008 Summer Olympics
Boxers at the 2015 European Games
European Games competitors for Moldova
Recipients of the Order of Honour (Moldova)